Newbigging is the name of several places in Scotland:

Newbigging, Angus, Scotland
Newbigging, Auchtertool, Fife, Scotland
Newbigging, Burntisland, Fife, Scotland
Newbigging, Carnock, Fife, Scotland
Newbigging, Orkney, Scotland
Newbigging, Scottish Borders, Scotland
Newbigging, South Lanarkshire, Scotland

People surnamed Newbigging
 David Newbigging (born 1934), British businessman
 John Steuart Newbigging (1809–1849), Scottish lawyer 
 Patrick Newbigging (1813–1864), Scottish surgeon 
 Sandy Newbigging (1876–1976), Scottish footballer for Nottingham Forest, Rangers, Reading
 Willie Newbigging (1874–1954), Scottish footballer for Tottenham, Fulham – brother of Sandy 
 William Newbigging (1773–1852), Scottish surgeon – father of John and Patrick

See also
 Newbiggin (disambiguation)